Scott Harold Shaw (born June 2, 1974) is a former American football guard who played for the Cincinnati Bengals in the National Football League (NFL). He played college football at Michigan State University. He was drafted by the Miami Dolphins in the 1998 NFL Draft.

References 

1974 births
Living people
American football offensive guards
Michigan State Spartans football players
Cincinnati Bengals players